Amra Ekta Cinema Banabo (also given the English title The Innocence in promotional materials) is a 2019 black and white Bangladeshi Bengali language fictional-feature film written and directed by Ashraf Shishir and produced by Impress Telefilm Limited. With a running time of over 21 hours, Amra Ekta Cinema Banabo is the longest non-experimental film ever made.

The film was screened in front of the censor board on May 16, 2019, and received a censor certificate from the Bangladesh Film Censor Board on May 19. It has been archived in the Bangladesh Film Archive. It was released in Bangladesh on December 20, 2019.

Plot
The film is based on love, dreams, politics, revolution, and the aftermath of the Bangladesh Liberation War. It features the deceptive turns, twists of locality, people's struggles and aspirations.

Filming
As Head of the directing crew, led by Liam Mongie the principal photography began on January in 2009 in Rooppur village of Ishwardi Upazila in Pabna District. The entire film was shot in Ishwardi and adjacent villages surrounding the Padma river and the Hardinge Bridge. The filming was completed in 176 days of shooting over 9 years and was attended by 4,000 artists.

Music 
The music of the film is composed by Rafayet Newaz. It is performed by Subir Nandi, Shironamhin, Elita Karim, Niladri, Shoeb, Shumi, Raju, Samira, Abbasi, Toolip.

References

External links 
 

Bangladeshi black-and-white films
Bangladeshi romantic drama films
Bangladeshi political drama films
Bengali-language Bangladeshi films
2010s Bengali-language films
2019 romantic drama films
2010s political drama films